António Augusto Soares de Passos (27 November 1826 – 8 February 1860), also referred to simply as Soares de Passos, was a Portuguese poet, creator of the "Ultra-Romanticism" in Portugal. Son of merchants and a follower of the Liberal ideas, having learned French and English during his youth, he entered at the University of Coimbra to graduate in Law. There, he met Alexandre Braga, Silva Ferraz and Aires de Gouveia, founding with them, in 1851, the magazine O Novo Trovador (The New Trobadour).

Having already graduated, in 1854, he returned to Porto, collaborating in the poetry journals O Bardo (The Bard) and A Grinalda (The Garland). The only book Passos published during his lifetime was his poetry book Poesias (Poetry), in 1856. The poems mostly speak of death and the wrath of God, all of them with heavy mal du siècle traces.

Having a very tumultuated life, and constantly assailed by diseases, he died in 1860, a victim of tuberculosis.

External links
 
 
 Three poems by Soares de Passos 

1826 births
1860 deaths
19th-century Portuguese poets
Portuguese male poets
19th-century deaths from tuberculosis
Romantic poets
Portuguese journalists
University of Coimbra alumni
People from Porto
19th-century journalists
Male journalists
19th-century male writers
Tuberculosis deaths in Portugal